The Antidote is the second studio album by The Wiseguys, released through Wall of Sound on 5 October 1998. It peaked at number 133 on the Billboard 200 chart.

Track listing

Personnel
Credits adapted from liner notes.
 Touché – production, arrangement, turntables, recording, mixing
 Laurence Diana – recording, mixing
 Tim Shanley – engineering
 Mike Marsh – mastering
 Eric Hine – mastering
 Mark Jones – executive production

Charts

References

External links
 

1998 albums
The Wiseguys albums
Wall of Sound (record label) albums